Radio Sputnik was a Finnish radio station with programming in the Russian language. The station ceased broadcasting in 2018.

References

External links
 

Radio stations in Finland
Radio stations established in 1999
Radio stations disestablished in 2018
Defunct radio stations
Defunct mass media in Finland